William Frederick Holm (July 21, 1912 – July 27, 1977) was a Major League Baseball catcher who played for the Chicago Cubs (1943–1944) and Boston Red Sox (1945).  A native of Chicago, he stood 5'10½" and weighed 168 lbs.

Holm is one of many ballplayers who only appeared in the major leagues during World War II.  He made his major league debut on September 24, 1943 in a home game against the Philadelphia Blue Jays at Wrigley Field.

In a career total of 119 games he hit .156 (44-for-282, 39 singles) with 15 runs batted in and 22 runs scored.  41 walks, however, did push his on-base percentage up to .272.  He made 8 errors in 417 chances for a fielding percentage of .981.

External links

Retrosheet

Major League Baseball catchers
Chicago Cubs players
Boston Red Sox players
1912 births
1977 deaths
Baseball players from Chicago
Newark Yankees players